Welfley–Shuler House is a historic home located near Shenandoah, Page County, Virginia.

Construction 
It was built about 1876, and is a two-story, stuccoed stone dwelling with hipped roof and a two-story rear ell. It has a one-story side wing, a two-story front porch, and an enclosed one-story porch on the south side of the ell.  It features vernacular Greek Revival and Italianate style exterior decorative details.  It was renovated in 1989–1993. Also on the property are the contributing stone milkhouse (c. 1876), the foundations of a bank barn and watering trough (c. 1930).

Registry 
It was listed on the National Register of Historic Places in 1999.

References

Houses on the National Register of Historic Places in Virginia
Italianate architecture in Virginia
Greek Revival houses in Virginia
Houses completed in 1876
Houses in Page County, Virginia
National Register of Historic Places in Page County, Virginia